Curbelo is a Spanish surname. Found in the Canary Islands in the 18th century, it spread from Lanzarote to the New World. It is most common in Uruguay and Cuba.

Notable people with the surname include:

 Alejandro Curbelo (born 1973), Uruguayan soccer player
 André Curbelo Basketball player for the University of Illinois at Urbana–Champaign
 Carlos Curbelo (politician) (born 1980), American politician
 Carlos Curbelo (footballer) (born 1954), Uruguayan-French soccer player
 Cecilia Curbelo (born 1975), Uruguayan journalist
 Gaston Curbelo (born 1976), French soccer player
 Gonzalo Curbelo (born 1987), Uruguayan soccer player
 Jorge Curbelo (born 1981), Uruguayan soccer player
 José Curbelo (1917–2012), Cuban pianist and bandleader
 Juan Ramón Curbelo (born 1979), Uruguayan soccer player
 Juan Curbelo (Tejano settler) (1680–1760), Spanish politician, mayor of San Antonio, Texas
 Nestor Curbelo (born 1952), Uruguayan historian
 Silvia Álvarez Curbelo (born 1940), Puerto Rican historian and writer
 Silvia Curbelo, Cuban-American poet and writer

References

Surnames of Spanish origin